For the history of American literature see American literature.

American Literary History is a quarterly peer-reviewed academic journal published by Oxford University Press that covers all periods of American literature. It was founded in 1989 and is edited by Gordon Hutner.

References

American Literary History at JSTOR

Literary magazines published in the United Kingdom
Quarterly journals
Publications established in 1989
History of the United States journals
Oxford University Press academic journals
English-language journals